Callisher v Bischoffsheim (1869–70) LR 5 QB 449 is an English contract law case concerning consideration. It held that the compromise of a disputed claim made bonâ fide is a good consideration for a promise, even if it ultimately appears that the claim was wholly unfounded.

Facts
Callisher alleged that money was owed to him from the Government of Honduras, and was about to take proceedings to enforce payment. In consideration that the plaintiff would forbear taking such proceedings for an agreed time, the defendant promised to deliver to Callisher a set of Honduras Railway Loan Bonds. But then, they did not deliver the debentures, and argued that their promise to do so was unenforceable because the original suit was groundless.

Judgment
The Queen's Bench held the contract was enforceable because even if the suit was groundless, forbearing to sue could count as a valuable consideration. Lord Chief Justice Cockburn said the following.

Blackburn J concurred.

Lush J and Mellor J stated their concurrence. New Zealand case law, Couch v Branch Investments (1969) Ltd, cites this case.

See also

English contract law

Notes

English contract case law
1870 in British law
1870 in case law
Court of King's Bench (England) cases